Lyman is a census-designated place (CDP) in Harrison County, Mississippi, United States. It is part of the Gulfport–Biloxi Metropolitan Statistical Area. The population was 1,277 at the 2010 census.

History
Lyman was once home to an express mail office, saw mill, and general store.

Lyman is located on the Kansas City Southern Railway. The Gulf Coast Lumber Company and Ingram-Day Lumber Company were both located in Lyman.

A post office operated under the name Lyman from 1901 to 1974.

The United States Fish and Wildlife Service operated a fish hatchery in Lyman until 1973, when the Mississippi Department of Wildlife, Fisheries, and Parks took over operations of the fisheries station.

Geography
Lyman is located at  (30.503222, -89.124894).

Demographics

2020 census

As of the 2020 United States census, there were 2,372 people, 835 households, and 595 families residing in the CDP.

2000 census
As of the census of 2000, there were 1,081 people, 367 households, and 289 families residing in the CDP. The population density was 135.8 people per square mile (52.4/km2). There were 413 housing units at an average density of 51.9/sq mi (20.0/km2). The racial makeup of the CDP was 86.22% White, 12.49% African American, 0.56% Native American, 0.28% Asian, and 0.46% from two or more races. Hispanic or Latino of any race were 1.48% of the population.

There were 367 households, out of which 42.0% had children under the age of 18 living with them, 63.5% were married couples living together, 11.7% had a female householder with no husband present, and 21.0% were non-families. 16.6% of all households were made up of individuals, and 5.2% had someone living alone who was 65 years of age or older. The average household size was 2.95 and the average family size was 3.31.

In the CDP, the population was spread out, with 29.5% under the age of 18, 11.7% from 18 to 24, 28.0% from 25 to 44, 23.5% from 45 to 64, and 7.3% who were 65 years of age or older. The median age was 33 years. For every 100 females, there were 97.3 males. For every 100 females age 18 and over, there were 94.9 males.

The median income for a household in the CDP was $41,786, and the median income for a family was $60,714. Males had a median income of $35,114 versus $26,985 for females. The per capita income for the CDP was $19,847. About 3.0% of families and 3.7% of the population were below the poverty line, including 1.7% of those under age 18 and 27.8% of those age 65 or over.

Education
Lyman is served by the Harrison County School District.

References

Census-designated places in Harrison County, Mississippi
Census-designated places in Mississippi
Gulfport–Biloxi metropolitan area